WASP-5 is a magnitude 12 yellow dwarf star located about 910 light-years away in the Phoenix constellation. The star is likely older than Sun, slightly enriched in heavy elements and is rotating rapidly, being spun up by the tides raised by the giant planet on the close orbit.

Planetary system
This star has one extrasolar planet WASP-5b detected by the SuperWASP project in 2007.

See also
 SuperWASP
 WASP-4
 WASP-3
 List of extrasolar planets

References

External links
 UK planet hunters announce three new finds (PDF requires acrobat reader)
 SuperWASP Homepage
 

Phoenix (constellation)
G-type main-sequence stars
Planetary transit variables
Planetary systems with one confirmed planet
J23572375-4116377
5